Lee Nelson (born January 30, 1954) is a former American football defensive back who played ten seasons for the St. Louis Cardinals.

College career
Nelson transferred to Florida State University from Pensacola Junior College in 1974. He walked on to the Seminole team and quickly won a starting cornerback job. He led the team in tackles his junior year (86) and was named the defensive MVP his senior year. He finished his college career by playing in the American Bowl All-Star Game. He was inducted into the Florida State Sports Hall of Fame in 1987.

Pro career
Nelson was selected in the fifteenth round by the St. Louis Cardinals in the 1976 NFL Draft. He played in 135 games at cornerback and strong safety over ten seasons with the Cardinals. He scored one touchdown on a fumble recovery against the Kansas City Chiefs in 1983. Nelson retired from the Cardinals after the 1985 season. He finished his career with seven interceptions, nine sacks, and nine fumble recoveries.

References

External links
NFL.com player page

American football cornerbacks
American football safeties
Florida State Seminoles football players
St. Louis Cardinals (football) players
People from Kissimmee, Florida
Players of American football from Florida
Sportspeople from Greater Orlando
1954 births
Living people